Dichotomyctere sabahensis is a species of pufferfish endemic to the southeast Asian island of Borneo.

It is also called the giant spotted puffer or the Saba puffer. The juvenile looks much like the spotted green pufferfish (D. nigroviridis), and both can live 15 years in an aquarium. Though the giant green spotted puffer seems to prefer a much lower salinity as an adult. It is safe to keep D. sabahensis at a salinity of 1.004 or half-brackish.

References

Tetraodontidae
Fish described in 1975